The men's 4 × 400 metres relay at the 2015 World Championships in Athletics was held at the Beijing National Stadium on 29 and 30 August.

Summary
During the heats, the United States and Trinidad and Tobago showed they were teams to be reckoned with.  Botswana showed immense raw talent but in severe need of coaching in the finesse of running competitive relays.  Elite American high school teams like Long Beach Poly, where Bryshon Nellum attended, would have been taught how to deal with handoff traffic and Botswana should have qualified.

In the finals, the first legs between Trinidad and Tobago (Renny Quow), Great Britain (Rabah Yousif) and USA (David Verburg) were relatively close, exchanging in that order.  France, Belgium and Jamaica were all close in the mix.  American Tony McQuay sped around the turn before the break and got enough of a lead to shut the door on the other teams, gaining a couple of metres as they dropped back to regroup and try to pass. Lalonde Gordon was able to put T&T slightly ahead at the handoff with a gap back to Great Britain and France, with Jamaica a few steps further behind.  Down the backstretch Rusheen McDonald brought Jamaica around into third.  As he paid for his efforts on the home stretch, he served as a blockade for Britain and France, Kevin Borlée brought Belgium around the outside into third by the handoff.  On the front, Deon Lendore, chased by Nellum stayed relatively even, with 400 finalist Machel Cedenio taking the baton ahead of 400 silver medalist LaShawn Merritt.  Merritt fell in behind Cedenio, who he had beaten by a second and a half four days earlier, to strategically prepare for a final pass.  Javon Francis brought Jamaica all the way from fifth place to sprinting past the lead duo on the backstretch.  Merritt went around Cedenio and started moving in on Francis for that final move.  Coming onto the home stretch, Merritt executed his best move on Francis leaving him behind while Martyn Rooney was edging up on Cedenio.  Francis, paying for his early speed, began to look like slow motion while everybody else was in real time.  Merritt went on to victory, Cedenio separated from Rooney and sped past Francis for silver, and just at the line, Rooney was able to dip past Francis for bronze so close it took the photo finish readers a minute to determine.

Records
Prior to the competition, the records were as follows:

Qualification standards

Schedule

Results

Heats
Qualification: First 3 of each heat (Q) plus the 2 fastest times (q) advance to the final.

Final
The final was held at 20:25

References

4 x 400 metres relay
Relays at the World Athletics Championships